Moensberg railway station is a railway station in the municipality of Uccle in Brussels, Belgium. It is operated by SNCB/NMBS. The station is on the line 26, which connects Halle to Schaerbeek, between the stations of Saint-Job and Beersel.

Train services
The station is served by the following service(s):

Brussels RER services (S5) Mechelen - Brussels-Luxembourg - Etterbeek - Halle - Enghien (- Geraardsbergen) (weekdays)
Brussels RER services (S7) Mechelen - Merode - Halle (weekdays)
Brussels RER services (S9) Leuven - Brussels-Luxembourg - Etterbeek - Braine-l'Alleud (weekdays, peak hours only)

References

Railway stations in Brussels
Uccle
Railway stations opened in 1973